Juliana Spahr (born 1966) is an American poet, critic, and editor. She is the recipient of the 2009 Hardison Poetry Prize awarded by the Folger Shakespeare Library to honor a U.S. poet whose art and teaching demonstrate great imagination and daring.

Both Spahr's critical and scholarly studies, i.e., Everybody’s Autonomy: Connective Reading and Collective Identity (2001), and her poetry have shown Spahr's commitment to fostering a "value of reading" as a communal, democratic, open process. Her work therefore "distinguishes itself because she writes poems for which her critical work calls." 
In addition to teaching and writing poetry, Spahr is also an active editor. Spahr received the National Poetry Series Award for her first collection of poetry, Response (1996).

Life
Born and raised in Chillicothe, Ohio, Spahr received her BA from Bard College and her PhD from the University at Buffalo, The State University of New York in English. She has taught at Siena College (1996–7), the University of Hawaii at Manoa (1997–2003), and Mills College (2003–).   With Jena Osman, she  edited the arts journal Chain from 1993 to 2003. In 2012, Spahr co-edited A Megaphone: Some Enactments, Some Numbers, and Some Essays about the Continued Usefulness of Crotchless-pants-and-a-machine-gun Feminism with Mills colleague and fellow-poet Stephanie Young.

Activism
Spahr's participation in the 2011 Occupy Movement is chronicled in her 2015 book That Winter The Wolf Came. According to Spahr, she spent time in the encampments and participated in protests, although she and her son "never spent the night." Her work examines social issues, including the repercussions of the BP oil spill, the global impact of 9/11, capitalism, and climate change. She uses poetry as a mechanism to provide cultural recognition and representation to social movements and political actions.

Following the Occupy Movement, the police shootings of Oscar Grant, Eric Garner, and Mike Brown, and the 2009 California college tuition hike protests, Spahr founded the publishing project Commune Editions, along with Jasper Bernes and Joshua Clover. The project was founded with the intention to publish poetry as a companion to political action.

Bibliography

Poetry
Nuclear (Leave Books, 1994) – full text
Response (Sun & Moon Press, 1996) – full text
Spiderwasp or Literary Criticism (Explosive Books, 1998)
Fuck You-Aloha-I Love You (Wesleyan University Press, 2001)
Things of Each Possible Relation Hashing Against One Another (Newfield, NY: Palm Press, 2003)
This Connection of Everyone With Lungs (University of California Press, 2005)
Well Then There Now (Black Sparrow Press, 2011)  
That Winter The Wolf Came (Commune Editions, 2015)

Fiction
An Army of Lovers with David Buuck, 
The Transformation (Berkeley, CA: Atelos Press, 2007)

Criticism
Everybody's Autonomy: Connective Reading and Collective Identity (University of Alabama Press, 2001)
 Du Bois's Telegram: Literary Resistance and State Containment (Harvard University Press, 2018)

Editor
Writing from the New Coast: Technique (essay collection) Co-editor with Peter Gizzi. (Stockbridge: O-blek Editions, 1993)
A Poetics of Criticism (essay collection) Co-editor with Mark Wallace, Kristin Prevallet, and Pam Rehm. (Buffalo: Leave Books, 1993)
Chain [co-edited with Jena Osman ], since 1994 full text
American Women Poets in the 21st Century: Where Lyric Meets Language  [co-edited with Claudia Rankine ], (Wesleyan University Press, 2002)
Poetry and Pedagogy: the Challenge of the Contemporary [co-edited with Joan Retallack ], (Palgrave, 2006)
A Megaphone: Some Enactments, Some Numbers, and Some Essays about the Continued Usefulness of Crotchless-pants-and-a-machine-gun Feminism [co-edited with Stephanie Young], (ChainLinks, 2011)

References

Living people
Bard College alumni
1966 births
People from Chillicothe, Ohio
University at Buffalo alumni
American women poets
Poets from Ohio
20th-century American poets
21st-century American poets
20th-century American women writers
21st-century American women writers
Siena College faculty
University of Hawaiʻi faculty
Mills College faculty
American women academics